George Frederick "Peaches" Graham (March 23, 1877 – July 25, 1939) was a baseball catcher for the Cleveland Bronchos, Chicago Cubs, Boston Doves/Rustlers, and Philadelphia Phillies.

Born in Aledo, Illinois, Graham played seven seasons of Major League Baseball over the span of eleven years. After a five-year hiatus, Graham returned in 1908 as a utility player with the Braves. He started games as a catcher, second baseman, outfielder, third baseman, and shortstop, but was predominantly a catcher. Graham was traded mid-season  to the Cubs, but only played there for three months before being traded for Dick Cotter to Philadelphia, where he would finish his major league career after the  season at the age of thirty-five.

He had a son, Jack, born in 1916, who would go on to play professional baseball. Graham died in Long Beach, California at the age of sixty-two.

References

External links

Peaches Graham at Baseball Almanac

1877 births
1939 deaths
Major League Baseball catchers
Cleveland Bronchos players
Chicago Cubs players
Boston Doves players
Boston Rustlers players
Philadelphia Phillies players
Rock Island Islanders players
Colorado Springs Millionaires players
Minneapolis Millers (baseball) players
Scranton Miners players
Toronto Maple Leafs (International League) players
Wichita Witches players
Des Moines Boosters players
Davenport Blue Sox players
Hannibal Mules players
Baseball players from Illinois
People from Aledo, Illinois